Kalanpa (also Romanized as Kalānpā; also known as Kalampā) is a village in Shaban Rural District, in the Central District of Meshgin Shahr County, Ardabil Province, Iran. At the 2006 census, its population was 141, in 29 families.

References 

Towns and villages in Meshgin Shahr County